Super Action Hero (슈퍼 액션 히어로 Syupeo Aegsyeon Hieolo) is a fighting game in platform style developed, published, and distributed(in most parts of the world) by the Korean Com2uS. In Brazil, however, it was distributed by Tectoy's mobile division.

The game has no plot, in order to proceed throughout the game, the player must complete missions instead of following a story.

Gameplay

The game has a visual considered unusual, the characters are stick figure-like with animations and effects similar to drawings in notebooks.

The game also has a so-called "hero bar", which will be reduced every second and when it ends, the mission also ends. It can be reduced more quickly when the player gets hurt, but in some missions there are items (such as stars) or conditions to be met to restore the bar.

After fulfilling certain requirements, players will unlock a mask. There are 32 masks in all, each one with appearances and status different from each other.

Some raise the hero bar, increase strength, and have a median agility and low defense, for example.

You can also increase or decrease the speed of the game according to the player's will.

Reception

The game was received in a very positive way, being praised for its visuals as simple, but striking, and that the commands are considered easy to learn.

However, it was criticized slow command response in some other cell types (such as N73).

References

External links
 The game's official page at Com2uS' site

Mobile games
2007 video games
Video games developed in South Korea
Fighting games